Jack Ridley may refer to:

 Jack Ridley (baseball) (1905–?), American Negro leagues baseball player
 Jack Ridley (pilot) (1915–1957), colonel in the United States Air Force
 Jack Ridley (engineer) (1919–2006), civil engineer and New Zealand politician

See also
John Ridley (disambiguation)